Bruach na Frìthe is one of the principal summits on the Black Cuillin ridge, on the Isle of Skye, Scotland. Like the rest of the range it is composed of gabbro, a rock with excellent grip for mountaineering. The Bruach cannot be seen in the popular view from Sligachan - the right hand peak which is often mistaken for it is the lower Sgurr a' Bhasteir.

This is one of the easiest and probably the most ascended of the main Black Cuillin peaks, requiring no scrambling ability. The simplest route ascends via Fionn Coire, though the slightly harder Northwest Ridge is also a popular route. All routes cross steep ground and scree.

The summit is one of the best viewpoints in the Cuillin. Though not the highest peak in the range, it is the only one to have an Ordnance Survey pillar.

References

External links
 YouTube video of ascent of Bruach na Frithe via Fionn Choire
 Guide to an ascent of Bruach na Frithe

Munros
Mountains and hills of the Isle of Skye